The Salutation Inn is a Grade II listed public house at 154 King Street, Hammersmith, London.

It was built in 1910, and the architect was A.P. Killick.

It is a Fuller's Brewery pub.

References

Grade II listed buildings in the London Borough of Hammersmith and Fulham
Grade II listed pubs in London
Pubs in the London Borough of Hammersmith and Fulham
Hammersmith
Fuller's pubs